Grigori Minaškin (born 1 February 1991) is an Estonian judoka. He competed at the 2016 Summer Olympics in the men's 100 kg event, in which he was eliminated in the second round by Maxim Rakov, and at the 2020 Summer Olympics in the men's 100 kg event, in which he was eliminated in the first round by Lkhagvasürengiin Otgonbaatar.

References

External links
 
 
 

1991 births
Living people
Estonian male judoka
Estonian sambo practitioners
Olympic judoka of Estonia
Judoka at the 2016 Summer Olympics
Judoka at the 2020 Summer Olympics
European Games competitors for Estonia
Judoka at the 2015 European Games
Judoka at the 2019 European Games
21st-century Estonian people